Olympia Vernon (born May 22, 1973) is an American author who has published three novels: Eden (2002), Logic (2004), and A Killing In This Town (2006). Eden won the 2004 Richard and Hinda Rosenthal Foundation Award from The American Academy of Arts and Letters.

Biography
Vernon was born in Bogalusa, Louisiana, and grew up in Mount Hermon, Louisiana, and Osyka, Mississippi. The family had seven children. Her father, Fletcher Williams, Jr., graduated from the University of Mississippi. Vernon attended South Pike High School in Magnolia, Mississippi. She received a Bachelor of Arts degree in criminal justice from Southeastern Louisiana University (SLU) in 1999. She also earned a Master of Fine Arts degree in Creative Writing from Louisiana State University in 2002. She was appointed writer-in-residence at SLU in 2004.

She wrote her first novel, Eden, while in graduate school. In 2005 she received the Louisiana Governor's Award for Professional Artist of the Year. In 2007-08 Vernon was the Hallie Ford Chair in Writing at Willamette University. In 2007, she won the Ernest J. Gaines Award for Literary Excellence for A Killing In This Town.

Bibliography
 Eden (2002)
 Logic (2004)
 A Killing In This Town (2006)

References

External links

1973 births
Living people
Louisiana State University alumni
Willamette University faculty
American women novelists
People from Bogalusa, Louisiana
Novelists from Louisiana
People from Pike County, Mississippi
Novelists from Mississippi
Southeastern Louisiana University alumni
21st-century American novelists
21st-century American women writers
African-American novelists
Novelists from Oregon
American women academics
21st-century African-American women writers
21st-century African-American writers
20th-century African-American people
20th-century African-American women